The 2006–07 Tampa Bay Lightning season was the 15th National Hockey League season in Tampa, Florida.  The Lightning hoped to rebound from their disappointing first round exit in 2005–06.  After head coach John Tortorella ripped his goaltenders during the 2006 playoffs, the Lightning pinned their hopes on Marc Denis, acquired from the Columbus Blue Jackets during the off-season.

Two Lightning players represented the Eastern Conference at the 55th National Hockey League All-Star Game in Dallas: Martin St. Louis scored a goal in the game, while Vincent Lecavalier recorded an assist.

Regular season

Season standings

Game log

October

Record: 5–6–0; Home: 3–4–0; Road: 2–2–0

November

Record: 8–5–2; Home: 4–3–0; Road: 4–2–2

December

Record: 5–8–0; Home: 3–4–0; Road: 2–4–0

January
Record: 9–4–0; Home: 2–2–0; Road: 7–2–0

February
Record: 9–2–2; Home: 6–1–1; Road: 3–1–1

March
Record: 7–7–0; Home: 3–3–0; Road: 4–4–0

April
Record: 1–1–1; Home: 0–1–0; Road: 1–0–1

Playoffs

The Tampa Bay Lightning ended the 2006–07 regular season as the Eastern Conference's seventh seed.

Eastern Conference Quarter-finals: vs. (2) New Jersey Devils
New Jersey wins series 4–2

Player stats

Awards and records
Maurice "Rocket" Richard Trophy winner
 Vincent Lecavalier 	52 goals

Records

Milestones
Vincent Lecavalier reached 50 goals in a single season and becomes the highest, single-season goal scorer in Lightning history, surpassing Brian Bradley's previous record of 42 goals in a single season.

Transactions
The Lightning were involved in the following transactions during the 2006–07 season.

Trades

Free agents

Waivers

Draft picks
Tampa's picks at the 2006 NHL Entry Draft in Vancouver, British Columbia.  The Lightning picked 15th overall.  Through a series of trades, Tampa had only four picks at this draft.

Farm teams

Springfield Falcons
The Falcons are the Lightning's top affiliate in the American Hockey League for the third year.

Johnstown Chiefs
The Chiefs are Tampa Bay's ECHL affiliate for the 2006–07 season.

See also
2006–07 NHL season

References

Player stats: Tampa Bay Lightning player stats on espn.com
Game log: Tampa Bay Lightning game log on espn.com
Team standings: NHL standings on espn.com

Tam
Tam
Tampa Bay Lightning seasons
Tamp
Tamp